Grandinin is an ellagitannin. It can be found in Melaleuca quinquenervia leaves and in oaks species like the North American white oak (Quercus alba) and European red oak (Quercus robur). It shows antioxydant activity. It is an astringent compound. It is also found in wine, red or white, aged in oak barrels.

It is a castalagin glycoside by binding of the pentose lyxose. It contains a nonahydroxytriphenic acid moiety.

It suppresses the phosphorylation of the epidermal growth factor receptor in human colon carcinoma cells.

See also 
 Phenolic compounds in wine

References 

Ellagitannins
Astringent flavors
Receptor tyrosine kinase inhibitors